Marvin Vincent Barker (born February 13, 1912), nicknamed Hack, was an American Negro league outfielder and manager.

A native of Joplin, Missouri, Barker made his Negro leagues debut in 1935 with the Newark Dodgers. He spent 12 seasons with the New York Black Yankees, and was selected to play in the annual East–West All-Star Game in 1940, 1945, and 1948. From 1945 to 1948, Barker served as New York's player-manager.

References

External links
 and Baseball-Reference Black Baseball Stats and Seamheads 
 

1912 births
Possibly living people
Negro league baseball managers
New York Black Yankees players
Newark Dodgers players
Newark Eagles players
Philadelphia Stars players
Baseball outfielders